The Moise A. Khayrallah Center for Lebanese Diaspora Studies is a public history and research center in the North Carolina State University's College of Humanities and Social Sciences. Its mission is to support the production and dissemination of knowledge about the Lebanese Diaspora in the US and throughout the world. Founded in 2010, the center is located in Raleigh, North Carolina.

The Center supports a digital archive of material about the Lebanese Diaspora, collects oral histories, produced the PBS documentary Cedars in the Pines: The Lebanese in North Carolina (2012), and collaborated with the North Carolina Museum of Art to produce the Cedars in the Pines museum exhibition documenting the history of the Lebanese-American community in North Carolina. The Center has also developed a K-12 curriculum and publishes the peer-reviewed journal Mashriq & Mahjar: Journal of Middle East Migration Studies.

History
In 2010, Dr. Moise Khayrallah funded a pilot project to research, preserve and publicize the history of the Lebanese in North Carolina. Originally called The Lebanese in North Carolina Project under the direction of the Khayrallah Program for Lebanese-American Studies, this initiative led to the production of the PBS documentary, the design and installation of a museum exhibition,  a K-12 curriculum, and the development of an online digital archive. Endowed in October 2014 with an $8.1M donation by the Moise and Vera Khayrallah Fund, the Project was renamed the Moise A. Khayrallah Center for Lebanese Diaspora Studies.

References

External links
 Official web site

North Carolina State University
Lebanese diaspora in North America